Clay Everett Bryce Dimick (born December 7, 1994) is an American professional soccer player who currently plays for Charlotte Independence in the USL Championship.

Career
Dimick played college soccer at Belmont Abbey College between 2013 and 2016.

While at college, Dimick appeared in the USL PDL for West Virginia Alliance and GPS Portland Phoenix.

Dimick moved to Australia to appear for both Westgate Sindjelic and Geelong in 2017.

2018 saw Dimick back in the United States with PDL side Charlotte Eagles.

After a three-month trial with Charlotte Independence, Dimick eventually signed with the USL Championship side on June 20, 2019. He made his professional debut on September 7, 2019, appearing as an 83rd-minute substitute in a 3–1 loss to Tampa Bay Rowdies.

References

1994 births
Living people
American soccer players
American expatriate soccer players
Association football defenders
West Virginia Chaos players
GPS Portland Phoenix players
Charlotte Eagles players
Charlotte Independence players
Soccer players from Atlanta
USL League Two players
USL Championship players